Flammarion may refer to:

 Camille Flammarion (1842–1925), French astronomer and author
 Gabrielle Renaudot Flammarion (1877–1962), French astronomer, second wife of Camille Flammarion
 Sylvie Flammarion (1836-1919), French feminist and pacifist, first wife of Camille Flammarion
 Flammarion engraving by unknown artist; appeared in a book by Camille Flammarion
 Flammarion (lunar crater), a lunar crater named after Camille Flammarion
 Flammarion (Martian crater), a Martian crater named after Camille Flammarion
 Groupe Flammarion, a French publishing company
 Camille Flammarion Observatory, the astronomical observatory